Dani Charlotte Dyer (born 8 August 1996) is an English television personality and actress. In 2018, she appeared on Survival of the Fittest, and later that year won the fourth series of Love Island alongside Jack Fincham. Since then, she has co-presented the MTV series True Love or True Lies alongside her father Danny Dyer, as well as co-hosting a podcast called Sorted with the Dyers with him.

Early life
Dani Charlotte Dyer was born to Joanne Mas and Danny Dyer on 8 August 1996 in the London Borough of Newham. She has a younger sister Sunnie and a younger brother Artie, and worked as a barmaid in Loughton, Essex before appearing on television.

Career
Dyer made her professional screen debut as an extra in the 2006 film The Other Half alongside her father. She also appeared as an extra in other films starring her father, including Doghouse (2009), Run for Your Wife (2012) and Vendetta (2013). The producer of Vendetta stated that she "absolutely blew away" the crew. She then independently appeared in films including We Still Kill the Old Way (2014), Age of Kill (2015) and Bonded by Blood 2 (2017). In 2018, she was announced as a cast member for the ITV2 reality series Survival of the Fittest, but walked from the series on the second day due to dislocating her shoulder. Later that year, she competed in the fourth series of ITV2's Love Island. She won the series alongside Jack Fincham with 79.66% of the final vote. Following their Love Island win, Dyer and Fincham starred in the three-part ITVBe reality series Jack & Dani: Life After Love Island. In 2019, she began appearing as a guest reporter on The One Show, and in 2020, she launched a range of lip products with Vaseline. Later that year, she began co-hosting a podcast with her father, titled Sorted with the Dyers. In June 2021, she made a guest appearance in the BBC soap opera EastEnders as a taxi driver named Jeanette and appeared alongside her father who portrays series regular Mick Carter.

Personal life
Dyer was in a relationship with Sammy Kimmence prior to appearing on Love Island. While on the series, Dyer was in a relationship with Jack Fincham; the pair split later that year. Dyer and Kimmence then were pictured together and it was reported that their relationship had been rekindled, which was later confirmed by Dyer. On 28 July 2020, the couple announced via social media that Dyer was pregnant with their first child. On 23 January 2021, she gave birth to a son named Santiago. She reportedly split from Kimmence after he was jailed for 3½ years (served 18 months) after scamming two elderly men out of £34,000.

On 27 December 2021, Dyer confirmed she was in a relationship with Premier League footballer Jarrod Bowen in an interview on The Lateish Show with Mo Gilligan. The couple announced on 20 January 2023 that they are expecting twins together.

Filmography

References

External links
 

1996 births
21st-century English actresses
Actresses from London
English film actresses
English soap opera actresses
People from the London Borough of Newham
Television personalities from London
Living people
Love Island (2015 TV series) contestants
Association footballers' wives and girlfriends